Özcan is a Turkish male given name which also appears as a surname. Notable people with the name include:

Given name 
 Özcan Arkoç, Turkish footballer
 Özcan Melkemichel, Swedish football manager
 Özcan Mutlu, Turkish-German politician
 Özcan Purçu, Turkish politician of Romani heritage
 Özcan Yorgancıoğlu, Turkish Cypriot politician

Surname 
 Ahmet Özcan, Swiss footballer
 Berkay Özcan, Turkish-German footballer
 Gazanfer Özcan, Turkish actor
 Kadir Özcan, Turkish footballer
 Macit Özcan, Turkish politician
 Muzzi Özcan, British Turk football agent
 Özgürcan Özcan, Turkish footballer
 Rahmi Özcan (born 1990), Turkish amputee footballer
 Ramazan Özcan, Austrian footballer
 Salih Özcan, German footballer
 Sümeyye Özcan (Paralympian), Turkish female Paralympian athlete and goalball player
 Ummet Ozcan, Dutch DJ of Turkish origin

See also 
 Özkan

Turkish-language surnames
Turkish masculine given names